Dallas Elementary School District #327 is a public school district headquartered in Dallas City, Illinois, which operates a single K–8 school. It previously operated Dallas City High School and was known as the Dallas City Community School District #336.

History

In 2001 Dallas City High closed and was converted into the Great River Community Center; the city government installed additional parking in front of the former high school. The Dallas City area was reassigned to Nauvoo–Colusa Community Unit School District 325 for high school, so that year 70 students and all but two of the Dallas City High teachers moved to Nauvoo–Colusa High School. In 2007, students from the Dallas City area began attending the new Illini West High School in Carthage.

See also
List of school districts in Illinois

References

External links
 Dallas Elementary School District #327

Education in Hancock County, Illinois
School districts in Illinois